
Gmina Miedźno is a rural gmina (administrative district) in Kłobuck County, Silesian Voivodeship, in southern Poland.

Villages
Gmina Miedźno contains the villages and settlements of Borowa, Izbiska, Kołaczkowice, Mazówki, Miedźno, Mokra, Nowy Folwark, Ostrowy nad Okszą, Rywaczki, Wapiennik and Władysławów.

Neighbouring gminas
Gmina Miedźno is bordered by the gminas of Kłobuck, Mykanów, Nowa Brzeźnica, Opatów and Popów.

References

Miedzno
Kłobuck County